The 2019–20 Florida Panthers season was the 27th season for the National Hockey League franchise that was established on June 14, 1993.  It is their first season under head coach Joel Quenneville.

The season was suspended by the league officials on March 12, 2020, after several other professional and collegiate sports organizations followed suit as a result of the ongoing COVID-19 pandemic. On May 26, the NHL regular season was officially declared over with the remaining games being cancelled. The Panthers advanced to the playoffs for the first time since the 2015–16 season and lost in four games to the New York Islanders in the qualifying round.

Standings

Divisional standings

Eastern Conference

Schedule and results

Preseason
The preseason schedule was published on June 12, 2019.

Regular season
The regular season schedule was published on June 25, 2019.

Playoffs

The Panthers faced the New York Islanders in the qualifying round, where they were defeated in four games.

Player statistics

Skaters

Goaltenders

†Denotes player spent time with another team before joining the Panthers. Stats reflect time with the Panthers only.
‡Denotes player was traded mid-season. Stats reflect time with the Panthers only.Bold/italics denotes franchise record.

Transactions
The Panthers have been involved in the following transactions during the 2019–20 season.

Trades

Free agents

Contract terminations

Retirement

Draft picks

References

Florida Panthers seasons
Florida Panthers
Florida Panthers
Florida Panthers